Brett Kennedy (born August 4, 1994) is an American professional baseball pitcher who is a free agent. He has played in Major League Baseball (MLB) for the San Diego Padres.

Early life and college
Kennedy grew up in Brigantine, New Jersey and attended Atlantic City High School in Atlantic City, New Jersey. In 2011, as a junior, he went 3–2 with a 2.10 ERA and sixty strikeouts over  innings. pitched. After graduating, he enrolled at Fordham University (the only Division I school to offer him a scholarship) where he played college baseball for the Fordham Rams. In 2015, his junior year, he compiled a 6–8 record with a 4.14 ERA, striking out 97 and walking only twenty over 87 innings. Over the course of his collegiate career, Kennedy posted a 15–17 record with 3.73 ERA and 218 strikeouts (tied for second-most in school history) in fifty appearances (thirty starts).

Professional career

San Diego Padres
Kennedy was drafted by the San Diego Padres in the 11th round (327th overall) of the 2015 Major League Baseball draft. He signed and made his professional debut that same year with the Tri-City Dust Devils, going 0–2 with a 2.70 ERA in 12 games (nine starts). 

In 2016, he pitched for both the Fort Wayne TinCaps and Lake Elsinore Storm, compiling an 8–11 record with a 3.55 ERA in 28 total starts between both teams, and in 2017, he played with the San Antonio Missions where he pitched to a 13–7 record and 3.70 ERA over 26 starts, earning Texas League All-Star honors. He began 2018 with the El Paso Chihuahuas and was named to the Pacific Coast League All-Star team. In 16 starts for El Paso, he posted a 10–0 record with a 2.72 ERA.

Kennedy made his Major League debut on August 8, 2018, earning the loss after allowing six runs over four innings to the Milwaukee Brewers. Kennedy recorded his first career win on September 1, 2018, pitching six scoreless innings against the Colorado Rockies. In his first Major League season, Kennedy went 1–2 in six starts with a 6.75 ERA and 18 strikeouts before a knee injury ended his season.

Kennedy experienced a lat strain in spring training in 2019 and pitched just one minor league inning that season due to injury. Kennedy was outrighted off the Padres roster on October 31. Kennedy did not play in a game in 2020 due to the cancellation of the minor league season because of the COVID-19 pandemic. To begin the 2021 season, he was assigned to El Paso. He was released by the Padres on September 12, 2021.

Long Island Ducks
On April 5, 2022, Kennedy signed with the Long Island Ducks of the Atlantic League of Professional Baseball. In six starts, he posted a 2–1 record with a 3.03 ERA and 27 strikeouts over  innings.

Boston Red Sox
On May 24, 2022, Kennedy's contract was purchased by the Boston Red Sox and he was assigned to the Double-A Portland Sea Dogs. He elected free agency on November 10, 2022.

References

External links

Fordham Rams Bio

1994 births
Living people
People from Brigantine, New Jersey
People from Galloway Township, New Jersey
Sportspeople from Atlantic County, New Jersey
Baseball players from New Jersey
Atlantic City High School alumni
Major League Baseball pitchers
San Diego Padres players
Fordham Rams baseball players
Arizona League Padres players
Tri-City Dust Devils players
Fort Wayne TinCaps players
Lake Elsinore Storm players
San Antonio Missions players
El Paso Chihuahuas players
Arizona Complex League Padres players
Long Island Ducks players